Keita Junior Karamokoba (born 15 April 1994), known as Keita Junior or simply Keita, is a Guinean footballer who plays for Israeli club Beitar Tel Aviv Ramla and the Guinea national team as a forward.

Club career
Keita was born in Conakry, but moved to Spain at early age. After representing Rayo Vallecano as a youth, he moved to CD Santa Eugenia in the regional leagues in January 2011, and made his senior debut for the club during the 2010–11 campaign.

In July 2011 Keita joined Huracán Valencia CF, returning to the youth setup. He was promoted to the first team in Segunda División B ahead of the 2013–14 campaign, but after appearing rarely, he was loaned to Tercera División side RSD Alcalá in January 2014.

On 25 August 2014, Keita agreed to a one-year loan deal with CD San Roque de Lepe also in the third division. The following 2 February he signed for Levante UD, being initially assigned to the reserves in the fourth tier.

Keita continued to appear in the lower leagues in the following years, representing Recreativo de Huelva, CF Peralada, Atlético Saguntino and Ontinyent CF.

International career
Keita was first called up for the Guinea national team on 26 October 2017, ahead of a 2018 FIFA World Cup qualifiers against DR Congo. He made his full international debut on 11 November, coming on as a substitute for Guy-Michel Landel and scoring the equalizer in the 1–3 away loss at the Stade des Martyrs in Kinshasa.

International goals

References

External links

1994 births
Living people
Sportspeople from Conakry
Guinean footballers
Association football forwards
Segunda División B players
Tercera División players
Liga Leumit players
Huracán Valencia CF players
RSD Alcalá players
CD San Roque de Lepe footballers
Atlético Levante UD players
Recreativo de Huelva players
CF Peralada players
Atlético Saguntino players
Ontinyent CF players
Beitar Tel Aviv Bat Yam F.C. players
CD Olímpic de Xàtiva footballers
Guinean expatriate footballers
Expatriate footballers in Spain
Expatriate footballers in Israel
Guinean expatriate sportspeople in Spain
Guinean expatriate sportspeople in Israel
Guinea international footballers
Guinea youth international footballers